Albert Stephen Boulton (November 2, 1887 – December 12, 1949) was a Canadian professional ice hockey player. He played with the Montreal Shamrocks of the National Hockey Association.

Boulton was also a member of the Edmonton Pros team which (unsuccessfully) challenged the Ottawa Senators for the Stanley Cup in January 1910.

References

External links
Bert Boulton at JustSportsStats

1887 births
1949 deaths
Ice hockey people from Ontario
Montreal Shamrocks players
Sportspeople from London, Ontario
Canadian ice hockey left wingers